Now, Follow Me is a South Korean reality show program on tvN STORY and tvN simultaneously.

It is airing on both tvN STORY and tvN starting from September 23, 2022. It is broadcast on Saturdays at 20:20 (KST).

Synopsis 
Four pairs of fathers and children who used to appear on "Dad! Where Are We Going?" and “The Return of Superman”, had come back together after some years and go on various trips together. However, this time, rather than the fathers who will be bring the children to various places, it will be the kids turn. The 4 kids will be in charge of planning and bringing their fathers for the whole trip together.

Cast members 

 Yoon Min-soo, Yoon Hoo
 Lee Jong-hyuk, Lee Joon-soo
 Choo Sung-hoon, Choo Sa-rang
 Lee Dong-gook, Lee Jae-si

Ratings 

 Ratings listed below are the individual corner ratings of Now, Follow Me. (Note: Individual corner ratings do not include commercial time, which regular ratings include.)

References

External links 
 

Korean-language television shows
2022 South Korean television series debuts
2020s South Korean television series
South Korean reality television series
South Korean travel television series